An Ancient Tale: When the Sun Was a God (Polish: Stara baśń: Kiedy słońce było bogiem) is a 2003 Polish film, directed by Jerzy Hoffman. The film is based on an 1876 novel, Stara baśń, by Józef Ignacy Kraszewski.

Cast
 Bohdan Stupka as Popiel
 Ryszard Filipski as Wisz
 Jerzy Trela as Wizun
 Ewa Wiśniewska as Jarucha
 Anna Dymna as Jaga
 Małgorzata Foremniak as  Księżna
 Maciej Kozłowski as  Smerda
 Michał Żebrowski as  Ziemek
 Katarzyna Bujakiewicz as  Mila
 Daniel Olbrychski as Piastun
 Maria Niklińska as  Żywia
 Andrzej Pieczyński as Znosek
 Marina Aleksandrova as Dziwa
 Mariusz Drężek as Bratanek
 Marcin Mroczek as Leszek
 Andrzej Krukowski as Ludek
 Maciej Zakościelny as Wramot
 Rafał Mroczek as Zdobek
 Dariusz Juzyszyn as Jarl Sigvald
 Wiktor Zborowski as Viking-Translator
 Ryszard Ronczewski as Miłosz
 Jan Prochyra as Mirsz
 Adam Graczyk as Sambor
 Krystyna Feldman as wróżka
 Michał Chorosiński as Bratanek
 Jerzy Braszka as Pachołek Ziemka

See also
List of Polish films
List of historical drama films

References

External links

Jomsborg vikings appeared in the movie

2003 films
2000s fantasy drama films
Films based on Polish novels
Polish fantasy drama films
2000s Polish-language films
Films based on Slavic mythology
Films directed by Jerzy Hoffman
Films based on European myths and legends
Films set in the 9th century
Films set in the Viking Age
Films set in Poland
2003 drama films
Films set in Europe